Old Blind Dogs is a Scottish musical group which plays traditional Scottish folk music and Celtic music, with influences from rock, reggae, jazz, blues, and Middle Eastern music rhythms.

Background
The three founding members of the band (Ian F. Benzie, Buzzby McMillan and Jonny Hardie) first met during a so-called "buskers' holiday" in the Scottish Highlands in 1990, and after playing together for the summer decided to call themselves "Old Blind Dogs". Dave Francis and Carmen Higgins joined the band soon afterwards, but left in 1992 before the recording of the first album, New Tricks. Since that time, the line-up of the band has changed frequently, with only Jonny Hardie remaining from the original group.

The Old Blind Dogs were named "Folk Band of the Year" at the Scots Trad Music Awards. Also in 2004, Jim Malcolm was named Songwriter of the Year. In 2001, the UK's Association of Independent Music selected their album Fit? as a finalist for the Celtic Album of the Year award.

The band have toured extensively, performing in Britain, the US, Denmark, Germany, Poland, Spain, Italy, and Russia.

Discography
 New Tricks (1992)
 Close to the Bone (1993)
 Tall Tails (1994)
 Legacy (1995)
 Five (1997)
 Live (1999)
 The World's Room (1999)
 Fit? (2001)
 The Gab o' Mey (2003)
 Play Live (2004)
 Four on the Floor (2007)
 Wherever Yet May Be (2010)
 Room with a View (2017)
 Knucklehead Circus (2021)

Band members

1990–92
 Ian F. Benzie (guitar, vocals)
 Jonny Hardie (fiddle, mandolin, guitar, backing vocals)
 Buzzby McMillan (cittern, bass)
 Carmen Higgins (fiddle)
 Dave Francis (percussion)
 Davy Cattanach (percussion) joined 1991

1992–96
 Ian F. Benzie
 Jonny Hardie
 Buzzby McMillan
 Davy Cattanach

1996–97
 Ian F. Benzie
 Jonny Hardie
 Buzzby McMillan
 Fraser Fifield (small pipes, saxophone)
 Davy Cattanach

1997–99
 Ian F. Benzie
 Fraser Fifield
 Graham Youngson (percussion)
 Jonny Hardie
 Buzzby McMillan

1999–2003
 Jim Malcolm (guitar, harmonica, lead vocals)
 Jonny Hardie (fiddle, guitar, backing vocals)
 Buzzby McMillan
 Rory Campbell (whistle, border pipes, guitar, harmonica, backing vocals)
 Paul Jennings (percussion) left 2002

2003–2006
 Jim Malcolm
 Jonny Hardie
 Rory Campbell
 Fraser Stone (drums, percussion)
 Aaron Jones (bouzouki, bass, backing vocals)

2007–2008
 Jonny Hardie (fiddle, guitar, vocals)
 Rory Campbell (border pipes, whistles, vocals)
 Fraser Stone (percussion)
 Aaron Jones (bouzouki, guitar, vocals)

2008–2016
 Jonny Hardie (fiddle, guitar, vocals)
 Ali Hutton (border pipes, whistles)
 Fraser Stone (percussion)
 Aaron Jones (bouzouki, guitar, vocals)

2016–
 Jonny Hardie (fiddle, guitar, vocals)
 Ali Hutton (Great Highland bagpipe, border pipes, whistles)
 Donald Hay (percussion)
 Aaron Jones (bouzouki, guitar, vocals)

In the following table, please note that although "Live" was released in 1999, the performers are those from the 1992–1996 line-up (Benzie, Hardie, McMillan, and Cattenach) and not those from "The World's Room" (a studio release from the same year).

References

External links

 
Compass Records, Old Blind Dogs' former record label 

Celtic fusion groups
Scottish folk music groups
Scottish folk singers
Scottish buskers
Green Linnet Records artists
Vertical Records artists